Carlos Prieto may refer to:

 Carlos Prieto (cellist) (born 1937), Mexican cellist and writer
 Carlos Prieto (handballer) (born 1980), Spanish Olympic handball player
 Carlos Miguel Prieto, Mexican conductor and violinist